Vox Lux is a soundtrack to the 2018 film of the same name, released by Columbia Records on December 14, 2018.

The album features a score by Scott Walker and original songs by Sia and producer Greg Kurstin.

Track listing
Track listing adapted from Consequence of Sound. Credits adapted from Spotify.

References

2018 soundtrack albums
Columbia Records soundtracks
Drama film soundtracks